Pseudocoracidae is a family of extinct mackerel sharks that lived during the Late Cretaceous. It includes two genera, Galeocorax and Pseudocorax.

References

Lamniformes
Prehistoric sharks
Shark families